Ostrea diluviana is a fossil species of oyster.

References

Ostreidae